Tonislav Hristov (born 18 December 1978, in Vratza, Bulgaria) is a Bulgarian filmmaker. He moved to Finland in 2001.

 Art High school, Vratza 1993-1997
 Technical University, Rouse 1997-2002
 Media school Yle/Etno-Basaari, Helsinki 2004
 Media school Yle/MUNDO, Helsinki 2005-2007
 Metropolia University, Helsinki 2005-2007 / Film Director
 Berlinale Talent Campus, Doc Station 2009
 Documentary Campus, Masterschool 2013
 Dok. Incubator 2016
 Other courses

Documentaries and short movies
 2019 The Magic Life of V, Tonislav Hristov – director, editor 
 2016 The Good Postman, Tonislav Hristov – director, editor 
 2015 	        Once Upon A Dream, Tonislav Hristov – director, editor, producer
 2014 	        Love & Engineering,	Tonislav Hristov – director
 2013 	        Soul Food Stories, Tonislav Hristov – director, editor, producer
 2011 	        Rules of Single Life, Tonislav Hristov – director
 2007/2008 	Virtual Love, Tonislav Hristov – director, producer (TV Documentary)
 2006/2007 	Family Fortune, Tonislav Hristov – director
 2006 	Searching for Hapines, Tonislav Hristov – director, camera, editor, producer (TV documentary)
 2005/ 2006 	My brother Fedja, Tonislav Hristov – director, camera, editor, producer (TV documentary)
 2005 	9 shorts / Yle Mundo, Tonislav Hristov – director, producer (TV documentary)
 2005 	Helcules, Tonislav Hristov – director, camera, editor (TV documentary)
 2004/20505 	On a trip / YLE Basaari, Tonislav Hristov – director, camera, editor, producer (TV documentary)
 2004 	Kids / YLE Bassari, Tonislav Hristov – director, camera, editor (TV documentary)
 2003 	Better Life, Tonislav Hristov – director, camera, editor (TV documentary)
 2003/2004 	In the face of dead, Kiti Luostarinen – technical assistant
 2003/2004 	3 Rooms of Melancholia, Pirjo Honkasalo – technical assistant

References

Interview with HBL

External links
Official site

Rules of single life on DocPoint
Cork film festival
Bulgaria by DocPoint
Hercules
Family Fortune
Interview for bTV

Bulgarian film directors
Living people
1978 births
People from Vratsa
Bulgarian expatriates in Finland
Bulgarian filmmakers